St. Joseph County, commonly called St. Joe County by residents, is a county located in the U.S. state of Indiana. As of the 2020 census, the population was 272,912, making it the fifth-most populous county in Indiana. Formed in 1830, it was named for the St. Joseph River which flows through it to Lake Michigan. The county seat is South Bend. St. Joseph County is part of the South Bend–Mishawaka, IN-MI, Metropolitan Statistical Area.

Geography

Cities

 Mishawaka
 South Bend

Towns

 Indian Village
 Lakeville
 New Carlisle
 North Liberty
 Osceola
 Roseland
 Walkerton

Census-designated places
 Granger
 Notre Dame

Other unincorporated places

 Ardmore
 Chain-O-Lakes
 Colburn
 Crumstown
 Dreamwold Heights
 Georgetown
 Gilmer Park
 Gulivoire Park
 Hamilton
 Lydick
 Midway Corners
 Nutwood
 Olive
 Pleasant Valley
 State Line
 Tamarack Grange
 Terre Coupee
 Westfield
 Woodland
 Wyatt
 Zeigler

Townships

 Centre
 Clay
 German
 Greene
 Harris
 Liberty
 Lincoln
 Madison
 Olive
 Penn
 Portage
 Union
 Warren

Adjacent counties
 Berrien County, Michigan  (north)
 Cass County, Michigan  (northeast)
 Elkhart County  (east)
 Marshall County  (south)
 Starke County (southwest/CST Border)
 LaPorte County (west/CST Border)

Major highways

Climate and weather 

Government

The county government is a constitutional body, and is granted specific powers by the Constitution of Indiana, and by the Indiana Code.

County Council: The county council is the legislative branch of the county government and controls all the spending and revenue collection in the county. Representatives are elected from county districts. The council members serve four-year terms. They are responsible for setting salaries, the annual budget, and special spending. The council also has limited authority to impose local taxes, in the form of an income and property tax that is subject to state level approval, excise taxes, and service taxes.

Board of Commissioners: The executive body of the county is made of a board of commissioners. The commissioners are elected county-wide, in staggered terms, and each serves a four-year term. One of the commissioners, typically the most senior, serves as president. The commissioners are charged with executing the acts legislated by the council, collecting revenue, and managing the day-to-day functions of the county government.

Court: The county maintains several courts: the Circuit Court that hears primarily civil matters and some criminal cases. The judge on the court is elected to a term of six years and must be a licensed attorney in good standing. The judge is assisted by three magistrates appointed by the judge. The Superior Court hears both civil and criminal cases, including small claims and traffic/misdemeanor cases. There are eight judges appointed to the Superior Court by the Governor of Indiana. They are assisted by four magistrates who handle the small claims and traffic/misdemeanor dockets. The Probate Court hears juvenile cases, child abuse or neglect cases, along with probate matters. The judge on the court is elected to a term of six years and must be a licensed attorney in good standing. The judge is assisted by three magistrates and one commissioner (similar to a magistrate) who are appointed by the judge. Decisions from these courts can be appealed to the Indiana Court of Appeals.

County Officials: The county has several other elected offices, including sheriff, coroner, auditor, treasurer, recorder, surveyor, and circuit court clerk. Each of these elected officers serves a term of four years and oversees a different part of county government. Members elected to county government positions are required to declare party affiliations and to be residents of the county.

St. Joseph County is part of Indiana's 2nd congressional district and was represented by Jackie Walorski until her death in August 2022 in the United States Congress and is currently vacant. Indiana's US Senators are Mike Braun and Todd Young.

St. Joseph County hasn't voted for a popular vote loser since 1976, tied for the longest streak in the country with Caddo Parish, Louisiana, and Rockland County, New York. In 2016 and 2000, it voted for Hillary Clinton and Al Gore, respectively, both of whom lost the electoral college but won the popular vote.

Since the Civil War, it only voted for popular vote losers in 1876, 1968, and the aforementioned 1976. In 1876 Rutherford B. Hayes won the election without winning the popular vote.

Demographics

As of the 2010 United States Census, there were 266,931 people, 103,069 households, and 66,365 families residing in the county. The racial makeup of the county was 78.7% white, 12.7% black or African American, 1.9% Asian, 0.4% American Indian, 0.1% Pacific islander, 3.4% from other races, and 2.9% from two or more races. Those of Hispanic or Latino origin made up 7.3% of the population. In terms of ancestry, 25.3% were German, 15.5% were Irish, 12.0% were Polish, 8.5% were English, and 4.5% were American.

Of the 103,069 households, 32.2% had children under the age of 18 living with them, 46.1% were married couples living together, 13.6% had a female householder with no husband present, 35.6% were non-families, and 29.1% of all households were made up of individuals. The average household size was 2.48 and the average family size was 3.07. The median age was 36.2 years.

The median income for a household in the county was $47,697 and the median income for a family was $57,510. Males had a median income of $45,269 versus $31,667 for females. The per capita income for the county was $23,082. About 10.7% of families and 14.6% of the population were below the poverty line, including 21.7% of those under age 18 and 7.8% of those age 65 or over.

Education

K-12 schools
School districts include:
 John Glenn School Corporation
 Mishawaka School City
 New Prairie United School Corporation
 Penn-Harris-Madison School Corporation
 South Bend Community School Corporation
 Union-North United School Corporation

Public high schools in the county include:
 John Adams High School (South Bend district)
 Clay High School (South Bend district)
 James Whitcomb Riley High School (South Bend district)
 Washington High School (South Bend district)
 Mishawaka High School (Mishawaka district)
 Penn High School (Penn-Harris district)

Private schools
Catholic schools on this list are operated by or associated with the Roman Catholic Diocese of Fort Wayne–South Bend 
 Christ the King [Grades K-8]
 Corpus Christi [Grades K-8]
 Covenant Christian School [Grades K-8]
 Granger Christian School [Grades K-12]
 Holy Cross Elementary [Grades K-8]
 Holy Family Elementary [Grades K-8]
 Ironwood Christian School [Grades K-12]
 Mishawaka Catholic School (St. Bavo Campus, St. Joseph Campus & St. Monica Campus) [Grades ECD-8]
 Michiana Christian School [Grades K-5]
 Mishawaka First Baptist School [Grades K-12]
 Marian High School [Grades 9-12]
 North Liberty Christian School [Grades K-5]
 Our Lady of Hungary [Grades K-8]
 Queen of Peace School [Grades K-6]
 Resurrection Lutheran Academy [Grades Pre K-8]
 St. Adalbert Elementary [Grades K-8]
 St. Anthony de Padua School [Grades K-8]
 St. John the Baptist Elementary [Grades K-8]
 St. Joseph Grade School [Grades K-8]
 St. Jude Elementary [Grades K-8]
 St. Mary of the Assumption School [Grades K-8]
 St. Matthew Elementary [Grades K-8]
St. Patrick School [Grades K-6]
 St. Pius X School [Grades Pre K-8]
 South Bend Christian Center [Grades K-12]
 South Bend Junior Academy [Grades K-8]
 South Bend St. Joseph's High School [Grades 9-12]
 Stanley Clark School [Grades K-8]
 Trinity School at Greenlawn [Grades 6-12]

Colleges & universities
 Bethel College
 Brown Mackie College (closed in 2017)
 Holy Cross College
 Indiana University South Bend
 Ivy Tech North Central
 St. Mary's College
 University of Notre Dame

St. Joseph County Public Library

History 
The St. Joseph County Public Library was founded in 1889. Originally known as the South Bend Public Library, it was founded by the South Bend School Corporation and managed by Evelyn Humphries out of a floor of the Oliver Opera House. Humphries soon secured funding for the building of the Main Library which opened to the public in 1896. It was known as "The Castle" due to its unique architecture.
In 1902, Virginia Tutt became the second library director. She opened the first library branch in Washington High School in 1918, which often served as a community center for Polish and Hungarian immigrants. The Betty Ruth Spiro Memorial Library replaced "The Castle" in 1959 as the new main library building in downtown South Bend. This building served the community until its renovation in 1992 led to a fire and subsequent damage from smoke and fire sprinklers. The renovation continued and the library was able to open 7 days later thanks to help from the community.
In 2016, Main Library began looking at the need for an expanded space in downtown South Bend to meet the needs of the growing community. After working with consultants and architects, it was decided in October 2018 that Main Library will expand to include a community learning center, renovated exterior, and inner courtyard. St. Joseph County is considering cutting the library's funding by almost $500,000 a year. As a result, on September 5, 2019, hundreds of residents protested in the streets, and all library branches closed early. Overflow crowds backed the county council meeting to show their support for the library.

Branches 
 Main Library
 Centre Township Branch
 Francis Branch
 German Township Branch
 Lakeville Branch
 LaSalle Branch
 North Liberty Branch
 River Park Branch
 Tutt Branch
 Western Branch

Library Services

Studio 304 
Technology hub where patrons can explore 3-D printing, poster printing, iPads, Adobe Creative Suite, gaming, virtual reality rigs, and recording rooms.

Local and Family History 
Books, newspapers, yearbooks, magazines, and other items of local significance can be examined. Online archives and genealogical websites are also available to reference in the creation of family trees.

Databases 
SJCPL subscribes to over 50 databases that can aid in research, education, grant writing, and business development.

Homebound Delivery 
Library staff members will bring library materials directly to your home if requested.

See also
 List of public art in St. Joseph County, Indiana
 National Register of Historic Places listings in St. Joseph County, Indiana

References

External links
 St. Joseph County Public Library
 St. Joseph County Website

 
Indiana counties
1830 establishments in Indiana
Populated places established in 1830
South Bend – Mishawaka metropolitan area